Events from the year 1967 in the United States.

Incumbents

Federal Government 
 President: Lyndon B. Johnson (D-Texas)
 Vice President: Hubert Humphrey (D-Minnesota)
 Chief Justice: Earl Warren (California)
 Speaker of the House of Representatives: John William McCormack (D-Massachusetts)
 Senate Majority Leader: Mike Mansfield (D-Montana)
 Congress: 89th (until January 3), 90th (starting January 3)

Events

January

January 2 – Ronald Reagan, past movie actor and future President of the U.S., is inaugurated the new governor of California.
January 4 – The Doors' self-titled debut album is released.
January 6 – Vietnam War: United States Marine Corps and Army of the Republic of Vietnam troops launch Operation Deckhouse Five in the Mekong Delta.
January 8 – Vietnam War: Operation Cedar Falls starts.
January 11 – Segregationist Lester Maddox is sworn in as Governor of Georgia.
January 12 – Dr. James Bedford becomes the first person to be cryonically preserved with the intent of future resuscitation. 
January 14 
The New York Times reports that the U.S. Army is conducting secret germ warfare experiments.
The Human Be-In takes place in Golden Gate Park, San Francisco; the event sets the stage for the Summer of Love.
January 15 – Super Bowl I: The Green Bay Packers defeat the Kansas City Chiefs 35–10 at the Los Angeles Memorial Coliseum.
January 18 – Albert DeSalvo is convicted of numerous crimes and sentenced to life in prison.
January 27 
Apollo 1: U.S. astronauts Gus Grissom, Ed White, and Roger Chaffee are killed when fire breaks out in their Apollo spacecraft during a launch pad test.
The United States, Soviet Union and United Kingdom sign the Outer Space Treaty.
January 28 – The Mantra-Rock Dance, called the "ultimate high" of the hippie era, takes place in San Francisco, featuring Swami Bhaktivedanta, Janis Joplin, The Grateful Dead and Allen Ginsberg.

February
 February 2 – The American Basketball Association is formed.
 February 5 – NASA launches Lunar Orbiter 3.
 February 10 – The Twenty-fifth Amendment to the United States Constitution (presidential succession and disability) is ratified.
 February 13 – American researchers discover the Madrid Codices by Leonardo da Vinci in the National Library of Spain.
 February 14 – "Respect" is recorded by Aretha Franklin (to be released in April).
 February 18 – New Orleans District Attorney Jim Garrison claims he will solve the John F. Kennedy assassination, and that a conspiracy was planned in New Orleans.
 February 23 – The Twenty-fifth Amendment to the United States Constitution is enacted, outlining rules of succession of the presidency.
 February 25 – The Human Be-In#2 is held in Griffith Park, Los Angeles, CA.

March
 March 7 – Jimmy Hoffa begins his 8-year sentence for attempting to bribe a jury.
 March 9 – Joseph Stalin's daughter, Svetlana Alliluyeva, defects to the USA via the U.S. Embassy in New Delhi.
 March 14 – The body of U.S. President John F. Kennedy is moved to a permanent burial place at Arlington National Cemetery.
 March 26 – 10,000 gather for the Central Park be-in.
 March 29 – A 13-day TV strike begins in the U.S.
 March 31 – U.S. President Lyndon B. Johnson signs the Consular Treaty.

April
 April 1 – The Department of Transportation begins operation. The Federal Aviation Administration is folded into the DOT.
 April 4 – Martin Luther King Jr. denounces the Vietnam War during a religious service in New York City.
 April 9 – The first Boeing 737 (a 100 series) takes its maiden flight.
 April 10 – The AFTRA strike is settled just in time for the 39th Academy Awards ceremony to be held, hosted by Bob Hope at Santa Monica Civic Auditorium. Fred Zinnemann's A Man for All Seasons wins the most awards with six, including Best Picture and Zinnemann's second Best Director award (his first since 1953). Mike Nichols' Who's Afraid of Virginia Woolf? receives 13 nominations.
 April 12 – The Ahmanson Theatre opens in Los Angeles.
 April 14 – In San Francisco, 10,000 march against the Vietnam War.
 April 15 – Large demonstrations are held against the Vietnam War in New York City and San Francisco.
 April 20 – The Surveyor 3 probe lands on the Moon.
 April 21 – An outbreak of tornadoes strikes the upper Midwest section of the United States (in particular the Chicago area, including the suburbs of Belvidere and Oak Lawn, Illinois, where 33 people are killed and 500 injured).
 April 24 – The Outsiders is published. 
 April 28 
In Houston, boxer Muhammad Ali refuses military service.
Expo 67 opens to the public, with over 310,000 people attending. Al Carter from Chicago is the first visitor, as noted by Expo officials.

May
 National Mobilization Committee to End the War in Vietnam established.
 May 1 – Elvis Presley and Priscilla Beaulieu are married in Las Vegas.
 May 1 – Overmyer Network launches. It would shut down a month later.
 May 2 – Armed members of the Black Panther Party enter the California state capital to protest a bill that restricted the carrying of arms in public.
 May 4 – Lunar Orbiter 4 is launched by the United States.
 May 6 – Four hundred students seize the administration building at Cheney State College, now Cheyney University of Pennsylvania, the oldest institute for higher education for African Americans.
May 18
Tennessee Governor Ellington repeals the "Monkey Law" (officially the Butler Act; see the Scopes Trial).
NASA announces the crew for the Apollo 7 space mission (first manned Apollo flight): Walter M. Schirra Jr., Donn F. Eisele, and R. Walter Cunningham.
 May 19 – The Soviet Union ratifies a treaty with the United States and the United Kingdom, banning nuclear weapons from outer space.
 May 25 – The Twenty-fifth Amendment is added to the Constitution.

June
 June 2 – Luis Monge is executed in Colorado's gas chamber, in the last pre-Furman execution in the United States.
 June 5 – Murderer Richard Speck is sentenced to death in the electric chair for killing eight student nurses in Chicago.
 June 7 – Two Moby Grape members are arrested for contributing to the delinquency of minors.
 June 8 – Six-Day War – USS Liberty incident: Israeli fighter jets and Israeli warships fire at the USS Liberty off Gaza, killing 34 and wounding 171.
 June 11 – A race riot occurs in Tampa, Florida after the shooting death of Martin Chambers by police while allegedly robbing a camera store. The unrest lasts until June 15.
 June 12 – Loving v. Virginia: The United States Supreme Court declares all U.S. state laws prohibiting interracial marriage to be unconstitutional.
 June 13 – Solicitor General Thurgood Marshall is nominated as the first African American justice of the United States Supreme Court.
 June 14 – Mariner program: Mariner 5 is launched toward Venus.
 June 14–June 15 – Glenn Gould records Prokofiev's Seventh Piano Sonata, Op. 83, in New York City (his only recording of a Prokofiev composition).
 June 16 – The Monterey Pop Festival begins and is held for 3 days.
 June 23 – Cold War: U.S. President Lyndon B. Johnson meets with Soviet Premier Alexei Kosygin in Glassboro, New Jersey, for the 3-day Glassboro Summit Conference. Johnson travels to Los Angeles for a dinner at the Century Plaza Hotel where earlier in the day thousands of war protesters clashed with L.A. police.
 June 26 – The Buffalo Race Riot begins, lasting until July 1; leads to 200 arrests.
 June 29 – Actress Jayne Mansfield and two others die in an automobile crash near Slidell, Louisiana. Mansfield's daughter, Mariska Hargitay, is asleep in the back seat at the time of the crash and survives.

July
 July 1 – American Samoa's first constitution becomes effective.
 July 2 – Walt Disney's Carousel of Progress opens at Disneyland.
July 5 – Freedom of Information Act becomes effective.
 July 12 – After the arrest of an African-American cab driver for allegedly illegally driving around a police car and gunning it down the road, rioting breaks out in Newark, New Jersey, and continues for five days.
 July 14 – Near Newark, New Jersey, the Plainfield riots also occur.
 July 16 – A prison riot in Jay, Florida leaves 37 dead.
 July 18 – The United Kingdom announces the closing of its military bases in Malaysia and Singapore. Australia and the U.S. disapprove.
 July 19 – A race riot breaks out in the North Side of Minneapolis on Plymouth Street during the Minneapolis Aquatennial Parade. Businesses are vandalized and fires break out in the area, although the disturbance is quelled within hours.  However, the next day, a shooting sets off another incident in the same area that leads to 18 fires, 36 arrests, 3 shootings, 2 dozen people injured, and damages totaling $4.2 million. There will be two more such incidents in the following two weeks.
 July 21 – The town of Winneconne, Wisconsin, announces secession from the United States because it is not included in the official maps and declares war. Secession is repealed the next day.
 July 23
12th Street Riot: In Detroit, one of the worst riots in United States history begins on 12th Street in the predominantly African American inner city: 43 are killed, 342 injured and 1,400 buildings burned.
Riots break out in Rochester, New York and lasts until July 24. 2 people would die and $60,000 dollars worth of damage would be dealt. It will be one of many riots that occurred during the Long, hot summer of 1967.
 July 29 – An explosion and fire aboard the U.S. Navy aircraft carrier  in the Gulf of Tonkin leaves 134 dead.
 July 30 
Joni Eareckson breaks her neck in a diving accident, becoming a quadriplegic. This leads to her starting 'Joni and Friends', a ministry for disabled people.
The 1967 Milwaukee race riots begin, lasting through August 2 and leading to a ten-day shutdown of the city from August 1.

August

 August 1 – Race riots in the United States spread to Washington, D.C.
 August 9 – Vietnam War – Operation Cochise: United States Marines begin a new operation in the Que Son Valley.
 August 21 – The People's Republic of China announces that it has shot down United States planes violating its airspace.
 August 23 – Jimi Hendrix's debut album Are You Experienced is released in the United States.
 August 25 – American Nazi Party leader George Lincoln Rockwell is assassinated in Arlington, Virginia.
 August 30 – Thurgood Marshall is confirmed as the first African American Justice of the United States Supreme Court.

September
 September 4 – Vietnam War – Operation Swift: The United States Marines launch a search and destroy mission in Quảng Nam and Quảng Tín provinces. The ensuing 4-day battle in Que Son Valley kills 114 Americans and 376 North Vietnamese.
 September 9 – Fashion Island, one of California's first outdoor shopping malls, opens in Newport Beach.
 September 11 – Sketch comedy series The Carol Burnett Show premieres on CBS. It runs for 11 seasons, until March 1978.
 September 17 – Jim Morrison and The Doors defy CBS censors on The Ed Sullivan Show, when Morrison sings the word "higher" from their #1 hit "Light My Fire", despite having been asked not to.
 September 18 – Love Is a Many Splendored Thing debuts on U.S. daytime television and is the first soap opera to deal with an interracial relationship. CBS censors find it too controversial and ask for it to be stopped, causing show creator Irna Phillips to quit.

October
 October 1 – The Boston Red Sox clinch the American League pennant in one of the most memorable pennant races of all time with Boston (92-70) beating out the Minnesota Twins and Detroit Tigers by one game; Carl Yastrzemski wins the baseball's Triple Crown.
 October 2 – Thurgood Marshall is sworn in as the first black justice of the U.S. Supreme Court.
 October 3 – An X-15 research aircraft with test pilot William J. Knight establishes an unofficial world fixed-wing speed record of Mach 6.7.
 October 12 – Vietnam War: U.S. Secretary of State Dean Rusk states during a news conference that proposals by the U.S. Congress for peace initiatives are futile, because of North Vietnam's opposition.
 The St. Louis Cardinals defeat the Boston Red Sox, 4 games to 3, to win their 8th World Series Title.
 October 16 – Thirty-nine people, including singer-activist Joan Baez, are arrested in Oakland, California, for blocking the entrance of that city's military induction center.
 October 17 – The musical Hair opens off-Broadway. It moves to Broadway the following April.
 October 18 – Walt Disney's 19th full-length animated feature The Jungle Book, the last animated film personally supervised by Disney, is released and becomes an enormous box-office and critical success. On a double bill with the film is the (now) much less well-known true-life adventure, Charlie, the Lonesome Cougar.
 October 19 – The Mariner 5 probe flies by Venus.
 October 20 – The Patterson–Gimlin film is shot in Bluff Creek, California supposedly capturing a Bigfoot on tape.
 October 21 – Tens of thousands of Vietnam War protesters march in Washington, D.C. Allen Ginsberg symbolically chants to 'levitate' The Pentagon.
 October 26 – U.S. Navy pilot John McCain is shot down over North Vietnam and made a POW. His capture is announced in The New York Times and The Washington Post two days later.
 October 27 – March on the Pentagon: several thousands people advance to the Pentagon to protest against the Vietnam War.

November
 November 2 – Vietnam War: U.S. President Lyndon B. Johnson holds a secret meeting with a group of the nation's most prestigious leaders ("the Wise Men") and asks them to suggest ways to unite the American people behind the war effort. They conclude that the American people should be given more optimistic reports on the progress of the war.
 November 3 – Vietnam War – Battle of Dak To: Around Đắk Tô (located about 280 miles north of Saigon near the Cambodian border), heavy casualties are suffered on both sides (the Americans narrowly win the battle on November 22).
 November 4 – Tampa Stadium in Tampa, Florida opens.
 November 7 
U.S. President Lyndon B. Johnson signs the Public Broadcasting Act of 1967, establishing the Corporation for Public Broadcasting.
Carl B. Stokes is elected mayor of Cleveland, Ohio, becoming the first African American mayor of a major United States city.
 November 9
 Apollo program: NASA launches a Saturn V rocket carrying the unmanned Apollo 4 test spacecraft from Cape Kennedy.
 First issue of the magazine Rolling Stone is published in San Francisco.
 November 11 – Vietnam War: In a propaganda ceremony in Phnom Penh, Cambodia, 3 United States prisoners of war are released by the Viet Cong and turned over to "New Left" antiwar activist Tom Hayden.
 November 17 – Vietnam War: Acting on optimistic reports he was given on November 13, U.S. President Lyndon B. Johnson tells his nation that, while much remained to be done, "We are inflicting greater losses than we're taking...We are making progress."
 November 21 – Vietnam War: United States General William Westmoreland tells news reporters: "I am absolutely certain that whereas in 1965 the enemy was winning, today he is certainly losing."
 November 29 – Vietnam War: U.S. Secretary of Defense Robert McNamara announces his resignation to become president of the World Bank. This action is due to U.S. President Lyndon B. Johnson's outright rejection of McNamara's early November recommendations to freeze troop levels, stop bombing North Vietnam and hand over ground fighting to South Vietnam.
 November 30 – U.S. Senator Eugene McCarthy announces his candidacy for the Democratic Party presidential nomination, challenging incumbent President Lyndon B. Johnson over the Vietnam War.

December

 December 4 – Vietnam War: U.S. and South Vietnamese forces engage Viet Cong troops in the Mekong Delta (235 of the 300-strong Viet Cong battalion are killed).
 December 5 – In New York City, Benjamin Spock and Allen Ginsberg are arrested for protesting against the Vietnam War.
 December 7 – The U.S. Public Health Service studies potential ray leakage from color TVs.
 December 8 – Magical Mystery Tour is released by The Beatles as an eleven-song album in the U.S. The songs added to the original six songs on the double EP include "All You Need Is Love", "Penny Lane", "Strawberry Fields Forever", "Baby, You're a Rich Man" and "Hello, Goodbye".
 December 10 – Soul singer Otis Redding, 26, is killed when the airplane he is on crashes into Lake Monona. The crash also claims the lives of all of his five-member band; the only survivor is fellow musician Ben Cauley.
 December 15 – The Silver Bridge over the Ohio River in Point Pleasant, West Virginia, collapses, killing 46.
 December 19 – Professor John Archibald Wheeler uses the term black hole for the first time.
 December 28 – Businesswoman Muriel Siebert becomes the first woman to own a seat on the New York Stock Exchange.

Undated
 Lonsdaleite (the rarest allotrope of carbon) is discovered in the Barringer Crater, Arizona.
 The Summer of Love is held in San Francisco.
 The Big Mac is introduced, initially in Pittsburgh.
 Warner Bros. Pictures becomes a wholly owned subsidiary of Seven Arts Productions, thus becoming Warner Bros.-Seven Arts.
 Long, hot summer of 1967 (various riots around June, July, and August)

Ongoing
 Cold War (1947–1991)
 Space Race (1957–1975)
 Vietnam War, U.S. involvement (1964–1973)

Births

 January 1 – Derrick Thomas, American football player (d. 2000)
 January 4 – David Berman, singer-songwriter 
 January 7 
 Tim Donaghy, basketball player and referee
 Guy Hebert, ice hockey player
 Dave Matthews, singer and artist, lead singer of Dave Matthews Band
 January 8 – R. Kelly, R&B singer-songwriter and basketball player
 January 24
 Mark Kozelek, singer and musician
 Phil LaMarr, actor, singer, and screenwriter
 John Myung, bass player and songwriter
 February 5 – Chris Parnell, actor and comedian
 February 13 – Carolyn Lawrence, television, film and voice actress
 February 18 – John Valentin,  baseball player and coach
 February 20 – Kurt Cobain, singer and artist, lead singer of Nirvana (died 1994)
 March 6 – Glenn Greenwald, journalist, author, and attorney
 April 18 – Maria Bello, actress and singer
 April 19 –
 Steven H Silver, journalist and author
 Dar Williams, singer-songwriter and guitarist 
 April 20 – Lara Jill Miller, actress
 April 23 – Rhéal Cormier, baseball player (d. 2021)
 April 26 – Kane, politician and pro wrestler
 May 1 –  Tim McGraw, country singer
 May 14 – Tony Siragusa, American football player (d. 2022)
 May 21 – Blake Schwarzenbach, singer and guitarist
 June 3 – Anderson Cooper, television personality
 June 5
 Matt Bullard, basketball player and sportscaster
 Joe DeLoach, sprinter
 Ray Lankford, baseball player
 Ron Livingston, actor
 June 20 – Nicole Kidman, Australian-born actress.
 June 21 – Jim Breuer, former Saturday Night Live cast member and stand-up comedian  
 June 22 
 Lane Napper, actor 
 Mike Sussman, screenwriter and producer
 June 29 
 Jeff Burton, stock car racing driver  
 Melora Hardin, actress and singer
 July 3 – Brian Cashman,  businessman
 July 11
 Andy Ashby, baseball player
 Jeff Corwin, biologist and wildlife conservationist
 John Henson, TV show host
 July 16 – Will Ferrell, comedian, impressionist, actor and writer
 July 18 – Vin Diesel, actor, writer, director and producer
 July 23 – Philip Seymour Hoffman, actor and director (died 2014)
 July 24 – Stacey Castor, poisoner who murders two of her husbands (died 2016)
 August 11 – Joe Rogan, podcaster, comedian and martial artist
 October 11
 Artie Lange, actor, comedian and radio personality
 David Starr, stock car driver  
 Tazz, professional wrestler and commentator  
 Joshua Braff, writer
 October 14 – Stephen A. Smith, sports TV personality
 October 23 – LaVar Ball, businessman
 October 28 – Julia Roberts, American actress
 November 2 – Scott Walker, 45th Governor of Wisconsin
 November 13 – Kristen Gilbert, serial killer nurse who murdered four patients
 November 15
Greg Anthony, basketball player and sportscaster
E-40, rapper and actor (The Click)
 November 21 – Ken Block, rally driver (died 2022)
 November 22 – Mark Ruffalo, actor and producer
 November 24 – Jon Hein, radio personality
 November 26 – Will Jimeno, Colombia-born Port Authority Police officer, survivor of September 11 attacks
 November 27 – KC Johnson, Professor of History at Brooklyn College and the City University of New York, known for his work exposing the facts about the Duke Lacrosse Case
 December 21 – Ervin Johnson, basketball player
 Date unknown
Michael Peri, military analyst

Deaths

 January 1 – Moon Mullican, country singer (b. 1909)
 January 3 
 Stanley Borleske, sports player and coach (b. 1888)
 Jack Ruby, assassin of Lee Harvey Oswald (b. 1911)
 January 16 – Robert J. Van de Graaff, physicist (b. 1901)
 January 17
 Evelyn Nesbit, actress and model (b. 1884)
 Barney Ross, boxer (b. 1909)
 January 18 – Harry Antrim, actor (b. 1884)
 January 21 – Ann Sheridan, actress (b. 1915)
 January 31 – Eddie Tolan, sprinter (b. 1908)
 February 18 – J. Robert Oppenheimer, physicist (b. 1904)
 February 28 – Henry Luce, magazine publisher (b. 1898)
 March 7 – Alice B. Toklas, memoirist and autobiographer, dies in Paris (b. 1893)
 March 11 – Geraldine Farrar, operatic soprano and actress (b. 1882)
 March 30
 Paul Clayton, folksinger and folklorist (b. 1930)
 Jean Toomer, writer (b. 1894)
 April 3 – Alvin M. Owsley, diplomat (born 1888)
 April 17 – Abbie Rowe, White House photographer (b. 1905)
 May 10
 Chuck Apolskis, American footballer (b. 1914)
 Margaret Larkin, writer, poet, singer-songwriter, researcher, journalist and union activist (b. 1899)
 May 15 – Edward Hopper, painter (b. 1882)
 May 27 – Tilly Edinger, paleoneurologist (b. 1897 in Germany)
 June 7 – Dorothy Parker, humorist, writer and critic (b. 1893)
 June 10 – Spencer Tracy, film actor (b. 1900)
 June 29 – Jayne Mansfield, film actress, dies with two others in automobile crash near Slidell, Louisiana (b. 1933)
 July 17
 John Coltrane, jazz saxophonist (b. 1926)
 Cyril Ring, film actor (b. 1892)
 July 22 – Carl Sandburg, writer and editor (b. 1878)
 August 22 – Gregory Goodwin Pincus, biologist, co-inventor of the combined oral contraceptive pill (b. 1903)
 August 25
 Paul Muni, film actor (b. 1895 in Austro-Hungary)
 George Lincoln Rockwell, American Nazi Party leader (b. 1918)
 September 1 – James Dunn, film actor (b. 1901)
 September 3 –  Francis Ouimet, golfer (b. 1893)
 September 16 – Ethel May Halls, actress (b. 1882)
 September 29 – Carson McCullers, fiction writer (b. 1917)
 October 3
 Pinto Colvig, actor, newspaper cartoonist and circus performer (b. 1892)
 Woody Guthrie, folk musician (Huntington's disease) (b. 1912)
 October 4 – Claude C. Bloch, admiral (b. 1878)
 October 25 – Margaret Ayer Barnes, playwright, novelist and short-story writer (b. 1886)
 November 5 – Joseph Kesselring, playwright (b. 1902)
 November 7 – John Nance Garner, 32nd Vice President of the United States from 1933 to 1941 (b. 1868)
 November 15 – Alice Lake, film actress (b. 1895)
 December 3 – Peter Bocage, jazz musician (b. 1887)
 December 4 – Bert Lahr, actor, played the Cowardly Lion in The Wizard of Oz (b. 1895)
 December 8  – Robert Henry Lawrence Jr., astronaut (b. 1935)
 December 10 – Otis Redding, singer, songwriter, record producer and musician (b. 1941)
 December 18 – Barry Byrne, "Prairie School" architect (b. 1883)

See also
1967 in American soccer
List of American films of 1967
Timeline of United States history (1950–1969)

References

External links
 

 
1960s in the United States
United States
United States
Years of the 20th century in the United States